In game theory, a Bayesian game is a game that models the outcome of player interactions using aspects of Bayesian probability. Bayesian games are notable because they allowed, for the first time in game theory, for the specification of the solutions to games with incomplete information.

Hungarian economist John C. Harsanyi introduced the concept of Bayesian games in three papers from 1967 and 1968: He was awarded the Nobel Prize for these and other contributions to game theory in 1994. Roughly speaking, Harsanyi defined Bayesian games in the following way: players are assigned by nature at the start of the game a set of characteristics. By mapping probability distributions to these characteristics and by calculating the outcome of the game using Bayesian probability, the result is a game whose solution is, for technical reasons, far easier to calculate than a similar game in a non-Bayesian context. For those technical reasons, see the Specification of games section in this article.

Specification of games

Technical definition 
In a Bayesian game, one has to specify strategy spaces, type spaces, payoff functions and prior beliefs. A strategy for a player is a complete plan of action that covers every contingency that might arise for every type that player might be. A type space for a player is just the set of all possible types of that player: the beliefs of a player describe the uncertainty of that player of the types of the other players (for example, does player A believe player B to be a hawk or a dove?). The payoff function describes the value attached to specific outcomes of a game by a player. And prior beliefs describe the beliefs that players have of other players at the start of the game.

Let  denote the set of all probability distributions on a set . A Bayesian game is a tuple  where

  is a set of players
  is a set of actions for player 
  is a set of types for player 
  is a joint distribution of types
  is a payoff function for player 

A pure strategy for player  is a function . A mixed strategy for player  is a function . Note that a player's strategy depends only on their own type.

A strategy profile  is a strategy for each player. A strategy profile determines expected payoffs for each player, where the expectation is taken over both the type profile  and the randomization over actions contained by the mixed strategy profile .

A player's payoff can depend on other players' types. If  depends only on  but not , the game is sometimes said to have private values.

Improvements over non-Bayesian games 
There are two important and novel aspects to Bayesian games that were themselves specified by Harsanyi. The first is that Bayesian games should be considered and structured identically to complete information games except by attaching probability to the game, the final game functions as though it were an incomplete information game. This accomplishes the following goals: the players can be essentially modeled as having incomplete information and the probability space of the game still follows the law of total probability. Second, Bayesian games are useful in that they do not require infinite sequential calculations. Infinite sequential calculations would arise where players (essentially) try to "get into each other's heads" by asking questions like "If I expect some action from player B, then player B will anticipate that I expect that action, so then I should anticipate that anticipation" ad infinitum. Bayesian games allows for the calculation of these outcomes in one move by simultaneously assigning different probability weights to different outcomes. The effect of this is that Bayesian games allow for the modeling of a number of games that in a non-Bayesian setting would be irrational to compute.

Bayesian Nash equilibrium
In a non-Bayesian game, a strategy profile is a Nash equilibrium if every strategy in that profile is a best response to every other strategy in the profile; i.e., there is no strategy that a player could play that would yield a higher payoff, given all the strategies played by the other players.

An analogous concept can be defined for a Bayesian game, the difference being that every player's strategy maximizes his expected payoff given his beliefs about the state of nature. A player's beliefs about the state of nature are formed by conditioning the prior probabilities  on his own type according to Bayes' rule.

A Bayesian Nash equilibrium (BNE) is defined as a strategy profile that maximizes the expected payoff for each player given their beliefs and given the strategies played by the other players. That is, a strategy profile  is a Bayesian Nash equilibrium if and only if for every player  keeping the strategies of every other player fixed, strategy  maximizes the expected payoff of player  according to his beliefs.

For finite Bayesian games, i.e., both the action and the type space are finite, there are two equivalent representations. We can compute Nash Equilibrium (NE) in these two equivalent representations and then recover the BNE from the NE.

 If we further consider two players with a zero-sum objective function, then we can form a linear program to compute BNE.

Variants of Bayesian equilibrium

Perfect Bayesian equilibrium

Bayesian Nash equilibrium can result in implausible equilibria in dynamic games, where players move sequentially rather than simultaneously. As in games of complete information, these can arise via non-credible strategies off the equilibrium path. In games of incomplete information there is also the additional possibility of non-credible beliefs.

To deal with these issues, Perfect Bayesian equilibrium, in the spirit of subgame perfect equilibrium requires that, starting from any information set, subsequent play be optimal. Furthermore, it requires that beliefs be updated consistently with Bayes' rule on every path of play that occurs with positive probability.

Stochastic Bayesian games

Stochastic Bayesian games combine the definitions of Bayesian games and stochastic games, to represent environment states (e.g. physical world states) with stochastic transitions between states as well as uncertainty about the types of different players in each state. The resulting model is solved via a recursive combination of the Bayesian Nash equilibrium and the Bellman optimality equation. Stochastic Bayesian games have been used to address diverse problems, including defense and security planning, cybersecurity of power plants, autonomous driving, mobile edge computing, and self-stabilization in dynamic systems.

Incomplete information over collective agency

The definition of Bayesian games and Bayesian equilibrium has been extended to deal with collective agency.  One approach is to continue to treat individual players as reasoning in isolation, but to allow them, with some probability, to reason from the perspective of a collective. Another approach is to assume that players within any collective agent know that the agent exists, but that other players do not know this, although they suspect it with some probability. For example, Alice and Bob may sometimes optimize as individuals and sometimes collude as a team, depending on the state of nature, but other players may not know which of these is the case.

Example

Sheriff's Dilemma 
A sheriff faces an armed suspect. Both must simultaneously decide whether to shoot the other or not.

The suspect can either be of type "criminal" or type "civilian". The sheriff has only one type. The suspect knows its type and the Sheriff's type, but the Sheriff does not know the suspect's type. Thus, there is incomplete information (because the suspect has private information), making it a Bayesian game. There is a probability p that the suspect is a criminal, and a probability 1-p that the suspect is a civilian; both players are aware of this probability (common prior assumption, which can be converted into a complete-information game with imperfect information).

The sheriff would rather defend himself and shoot if the suspect shoots, or not shoot if the suspect does not (even if the suspect is a criminal). The suspect would rather shoot if he is a criminal, even if the sheriff does not shoot, but would rather not shoot if he is a civilian, even if the sheriff shoots. Thus, the payoff matrix of this Normal-form game for both players depends on the type of the suspect. It is assumed that payoffs are given as follows:

If both players are rational and both know that both players are rational and everything that is known by any player is known to be known by every player (i.e. player 1 knows player 2 knows that player 1 is rational and player 2 knows this, etc. ad infinitum – common knowledge), play in the game will be as follows according to perfect Bayesian equilibrium:

When the type is "civilian", the dominant strategy for the suspect is not to shoot, and when the type is "criminal", the dominant strategy for the suspect is to shoot; alternative strictly dominated strategy can thus be removed. Given this, if the sheriff shoots, he will have a payoff of 0 with probability p and a payoff of -1 with probability 1-p, i.e. an expected payoff of p-1; if the sheriff does not shoot, he will have a payoff of -2 with probability p and a payoff of 0 with probability 1-p, i.e. an expected payoff of -2p. Thus, the Sheriff will always shoot if p-1 > -2p, i.e. when p > 1/3.

Enter the monopolized market 
A new company (player1) that wants to enter a market that is monopolised by a large company will encounter two types of monopolist (player2), type1 is prevented and type2 is allowed. Player1 will never have complete information about player2, but may be able to infer the probability of type1 and type2 appearing from whether the previous firm entering the market was blocked, it is a Bayesian game. The reason for these judgements is that there are blocking costs for player2, which may need to make significant price cuts to prevent player1 from entering the market, so it will block player1 when the profit it steals from entering the market is greater than the blocking costs.

See also 
 Bayesian-optimal mechanism
 Bayesian-optimal pricing
 Bayesian programming
 Bayesian inference

References

Further reading
 
 

Bayesian statistics
Game theory game classes